Omega Spielhallen und Automatenaufstellungs-GmbH v Oberbürgermeisterin der Bundesstadt Bonn (2004) C-36/02 is an EU law case, concerning the freedom to provide services and the free movement of goods in the European Union.

Facts
Omega GmbH claimed that a prohibition on it setting up a ‘laserdrome’, where people shot each other with fake laser guns, was an unlawful restriction on free movement of services. The Bonn government, under the Ordnungsbehördengesetz Nordrhein-Westfalen, applied a law saying ‘The police authorities may take measures necessary to avert a risk to public order or safety in an individual case’. This followed protests against the laserdrome because it was ‘playing at killing’ people. The guns came from a UK company Pulsar Advanced Games Systems Ltd.

The German Federal Administrative Court (Bundesverwaltungsgericht) held that banning the game was compatible with the Basic Law (Grundgesetz) article 1(1) on human dignity, ‘by the awakening or strengthening in the player of an attitude denying the fundamental right of each person to be acknowledged and respected’.

Judgment
The Court of Justice, First Chamber, held that the restriction on the service was justified, as it was done on the grounds of pursuit of human dignity.

See also

European Union law

Notes

References

European Union services case law
2004 in Germany
2004 in case law
Laser tag
History of Bonn